M. floribunda may refer to:

 Maackia floribunda, a legume native to East Asia
 Maerua floribunda, an African plant
 Magnolia floribunda, a plant with flower buds in enclosed bracts
 Malus floribunda, a plant native to East Asia
 Manilkara floribunda, a manilkara tree
 Maniltoa floribunda, a legume endemic to Fiji
 Masdevallia floribunda, a North American orchid
 Michelia floribunda, an evergreen plant
 Myrciaria floribunda, a fruit tree